"Last Thing I Needed First Thing This Morning" is a song written by Gary P. Nunn and Donna Farar, and recorded by American country music artist Willie Nelson.  It was released in October 1982 as the third single from his album Always on My Mind. The song reached number two on the Billboard Hot Country Singles chart and number one on the RPM Country Tracks chart in Canada.

American singer-songwriter Chris Stapleton featured a cover of the song on his studio album From A Room: Volume 1 (2017).

Chart performance

Certifications

References

External links

1982 singles
1982 songs
Willie Nelson songs
Chris Stapleton songs
Song recordings produced by Chips Moman
Columbia Records singles
Songs written by Gary P. Nunn